Laura Huxley (née Archera; 2 November 1911 – 13 December 2007) was an American musician, author, psychotherapist and lecturer. She was married to author Aldous Huxley from 1956 until his death in 1963.

Early life
Laura Archera was born in Turin, Italy, on 2 November 1911. She began playing the violin at the age of ten, studying in Berlin, Paris and Rome, where she earned a diploma of musical teaching at 17. She also studied at the Curtis Institute of Music in Philadelphia, played in a major symphony orchestra and played before the Queen of Italy at the age of 14, and performed at Carnegie Hall in her teens.

Life and career
In 1949, she was working as a freelance documentary filmmaker. According to her obituary in the
Los Angeles Times, Archera called philosopher and author Aldous Huxley at home, saying that John Huston
had promised to finance her proposed documentary film on the Palio di Siena if she could get Huxley to agree to write a
screenplay. Archera then became close friends with Huxley and his first wife Maria, who died in 1955.
In 1956, Archera married Huxley. She wrote several self-help books concerning human relations, including You Are Not the Target (1963) with a foreword written by Aldous Huxley.

After his death in 1963, she wrote This Timeless Moment: a personal view of Aldous Huxley (1968), a book describing life with her husband.

In 1977 she founded Children: Our Ultimate Investment, also known as "Our Ultimate Investment" or just OUI, a non-profit organization dedicated to the nurturing of the possible human. The organization sponsored a four-day conference also entitled Children: Our Ultimate Investment.

Film
She was a producer of documentary films, and an assistant film editor at RKO. Huxley appeared in Hofmann's Potion: The Early Years of LSD, a documentary from the National Film Board of Canada. Laura felt inspired to illuminate the story of their provocative marriage through Mary Ann Braubach's 2010 documentary, "Huxley on Huxley".

Death
Laura Huxley died of cancer, aged 96, at her Hollywood Hills home.

Awards and honours
Huxley received widespread recognition for her humanitarian achievements, including:

 Honorary Doctorate of Human Services from La Sierra University
 Honoree of the United Nations Fellow of the International Academy of Medical Preventics
 The 1990 World Health Foundation for Development and Peace Prize
 The 2003 Association of Prenatal and Perinatal Psychology and Health Thomas R. Verny Award, for outstanding contributions to the field of prenatal and perinatal psychology.

Bibliography
 1963 - You Are Not the Target - Metamorphous Press; Reissue edition (August 1995) ,  foreword by Aldous Huxley
 1969 - This Timeless Moment - Celestial Arts; New Ed edition (December 2000) , 
 1974 - Between Heaven and Earth - Hay House; Reprint edition (February 1, 1991) , 
 1986 - Oneaday Reason to be Happy - Compcare Publications , 
 1987 - The Child of Your Dreams (with Piero Ferrucci) - Compcare Publications ,

See also
 Huxley family

Notes

References

 Los Angeles Times obituary

External links
 
 Children: Our Ultimate Investment
 Laura Huxley biography
 
 Documentary of the life of Laura and husband Aldous Huxley On Huxley
 'Hofmann's Potion: The Early Years of LSD': Hofmann's Potion

American motivational speakers
Women motivational speakers
American self-help writers
Deaths from cancer in California
Italian emigrants to the United States
Italian violinists
People from Greater Los Angeles
1911 births
2007 deaths
20th-century American biographers
American women biographers
20th-century American violinists
20th-century Italian musicians
Laura
20th-century American women musicians
21st-century American women